The 1965 European Judo Championships were the 14th edition of the European Judo Championships, and were held in Madrid, Spain, from 23 to 24 May 1965. The Championships were held in two separate categories: amateur (seven events) and professional (six events). The amateur contests were subdivided into six individual competitions, and a separate team competition. As the Soviet and other Socialist judokas were competing on a strictly non-profit basis, they were allowed to compete both professionally, and as amateurs. As before, more than one representative of a single national team were allowed to qualify for participation in each event.

Medal overview

Amateurs

Amateur medal table

Professionals

Professional medal table

Teams

Overall medal table

References 

E
European Judo Championships
Judo
Sports competitions in Madrid
Judo competitions in Spain
1960s in Madrid
International sports competitions hosted by Spain
May 1965 sports events in Europe